Solibacillus isronensis is a bacterium from the genus of Solibacillus which has been isolated from a cryogenic tube from India. It is named after ISRO, India's space agency which discovered the species.

References

External links
Type strain of Solibacillus isronensis at BacDive -  the Bacterial Diversity Metadatabase

Bacillales
Bacteria described in 2009